Palladium (also known as "The Palladium Group", "Palladium Holdings" or "Palladium International") is an international development sector advisory, management and implementation firm, representing the combination of seven prior companies: GRM International, Futures Group, Palladium, the IDL Group, Development & Training Services, HK Logistics and CARANA Corporation. As of October 2016, Palladium employs over 2,500 persons operating in 90 countries. At the end of 2015, Palladium International was the fourth-largest private sector partner for the UK Government's Department for International Development (DFID). During 2011, Palladium International members Futures Group and Carana were USAID's fourteenth and sixteenth largest private sector partners, respectively. At the end of 2012, GRM International was the third largest private sector partner for AusAID.

Notable initiatives 
Palladium International is active in the expansion of social innovation including impact bonds, impact investing, and shared value. Select initiatives of Palladium Group include:

 Utkrisht Development Impact Bond (DIB) in Rajasthan, India 
 The SPRING Accelerator, a human centered design-based programme
 The Human Development Innovation Fund, an Enterprise Challenge Fund
 Innovation for Indonesia’s School Children (INOVASI)
 Innovation Impact Framework, Execution Premium Process (XPP) and Balanced Score Card
 IQCare (International Quality Care)
 Financing Ghanaian Agriculture Project (FinGAP)
In 2015, the firm announced the formation of the Positive Impact Research Institute to explore current and future trends in the Impact Economy and the affiliated Let's Make It Possible nonprofit organization.

Subsidiaries 
Subsidiaries of Palladium Group include:

 Enclude, acquired in 2018 from Triodos Ventures, an independent fund managed by Triodos Bank
 Palladium Consulting India Private Limited (PCIPL),established in 2015, is a joint venture of the Palladium Group with AP Globale. The CEO of PCIPL is Amit Patjoshi.

Notable persons 
Notable persons affiliated with Palladium Group include:

Robert S. Kaplan, Harvard University Professor and co-creator of the Balanced Scorecard
George Serafeim, Harvard Business School Professor
David P. Norton, co-creator of the Balanced Scorecard
Julie Bishop, Palladium board member and former Australian Minister for Foreign Affairs
Ann Sherry, Palladium board member, chief executive officer of Carnival Australia, and former public servant
John Eales, Palladium board member, hall of fame rugby player, and businessman
 Alonzo Fulgham, Palladium board member and former Acting Administrator of the United States Agency for International Development (USAID)
Kerry Packer, former Palladium board member and billionaire media magnate
 Sir William Archer Gunn (deceased), Palladium (formerly GRM International) founder
Theodore J. Gordon (The Futures Group founder)

Incidents 
On 20 November 2015, terrorist gunmen took 170 people hostage and killed 20 at the Radisson Blu Hotel in Bamako, Mali. In the 2015 Bamako hotel attack one American victim was Anita Datar, an international development worker at Palladium International working on its Health Policy Plus project. After the incident, Hillary Clinton described Ms. Datar by saying, "Anita Datar was a bright light who gave help and hope to people in need around the world, especially women and families.... She represented the best of America’s generous spirit."

References

International development organizations
International consulting firms
Economic growth